Dust is made of fine particles of solid matter. On Earth, it generally consists of particles in the atmosphere that come from various sources such as soil lifted by wind (an aeolian process), volcanic eruptions, and pollution. Dust in homes is composed of about 20–50% dead skin cells. The rest, and in  offices, and other human environments is composed of small amounts of plant pollen, human hairs, animal fur, textile fibers, paper fibers, minerals from outdoor soil, burnt meteorite particles, and many other materials which may be found in the local environment.

Atmospheric

Atmospheric or wind-borne fugitive dust, also known as aeolian dust, comes from arid and dry regions where high velocity winds are able to remove mostly silt-sized material, deflating susceptible surfaces. This includes areas where grazing, ploughing, vehicle use, and other human behaviors have further destabilized the land, though not all source areas have been largely affected by anthropogenic impacts. One-third of the global land area is covered by dust-producing surfaces, made up of hyper-arid regions like the Sahara which covers 0.9 billion hectares, and drylands which occupy 5.2 billion hectares.

Dust in the atmosphere is produced by saltation and abrasive sandblasting of sand-sized grains, and it is transported through the troposphere. This airborne dust is considered an aerosol and once in the atmosphere, it can produce strong local radiative forcing. Saharan dust, in particular, can be transported and deposited as far as the Caribbean and the Amazon basin, and may affect air temperatures, cause ocean cooling, and alter rainfall amounts.

Middle East
Dust in the Middle East has been a historic phenomenon. Recently, because of climate change and the escalating process of desertification, the problem has worsened dramatically. As a multi-factor phenomenon, there is not yet a clear consensus on the sources or potential solutions to the problem.

In Iran, the dust is already affecting more than 5 million people directly, and has emerged as a serious government issue in recent years. In the Khuzestan Province, it has led to the severe increase of air pollution. The amount of pollutants in the air has surpassed more than 50 times the normal level several times in a year. Recently, initiatives such as Project-Dust have been established to directly study dust in the Middle East.

Roads

Dust kicked up by vehicles traveling on roads may make up 33% of air pollution. Road dust consists of deposits of vehicle and industrial exhaust gas, particles from tire and brake wear, dust from paved roads or potholes, and dust from construction sites. Road dust is a significant contributor to the generation and release of particulates into the atmosphere. Control of road dust is a significant challenge in urban areas, and also in other locations with high levels of vehicular traffic upon unsealed roads, such as mines and landfills.

Road dust may be suppressed by mechanical methods like street sweeper, vehicles equipped with vacuum cleaners, vegetable oil sprays, or with water sprayers. Calcium chloride can be used.  Improvements in automotive engineering have reduced the amount of PM10s produced by road traffic; the proportion representing re-suspension of existing particulates has increased as a result.

Coal

Coal dust is responsible for the respiratory disease known as pneumoconiosis, including coal worker's pneumoconiosis disease that occurs among coal miners. The danger of coal dust resulted in environmental law regulating workplace air quality in some jurisdictions. In addition, if enough coal dust is dispersed within the air in a given area, in very rare circumstances, it can cause a dust explosion. These circumstances are typically within confined spaces.

Control

Atmospheric

Most governmental Environmental Protection Agencies, including the United States Environmental Protection Agency (EPA) mandate that facilities that generate fugitive dust, minimize or mitigate the production of dust in their operation. The most frequent dust control violations occur at new residential housing developments in urban areas. United States federal law requires that construction sites obtain planning permissions to conduct earth moving and clearing of areas, so that plans to control dust emissions while the work is being carried out are specified. Control measures include such simple practices as spraying construction and demolition sites with water, and preventing the tracking of dust onto adjacent roads.

Some of the issues include:
Reducing dust related health risks that include allergic reactions, pneumonia and asthmatic attacks.
Improving visibility and road traffic safety.
Providing cleaner air, cleaner vehicles and cleaner homes and promoting better health.
Improving agricultural productivity.
Reducing vehicle maintenance costs by lowering the levels of dust that clog filters, bearings and machinery.
Reducing driver fatigue, maintenance on car suspension systems and improving fuel economy in automobiles.
Increasing cumulative effects—each new application builds on previous progress.

US federal laws require dust control on sources such as vacant lots, unpaved parking lots, and dirt roads. Dust in such places may be suppressed by mechanical methods, including paving or laying down gravel, or stabilizing the surface with water, vegetable oils or other dust suppressants, or by using water misters to suppress dust that is already airborne.

Domestic

Dust control is the suppression of solid particles with diameters less than 500micrometers (i.e. half a millimeter). Dust poses a health risk to children, older people, and those with respiratory diseases.

House dust can become airborne easily. Care is required when removing dust to avoid causing the dust to become airborne. A feather duster tends to agitate the dust so it lands elsewhere.

Certified HEPA (tested to MIL STD 282) can effectively trap 99.97% of dust at 0.3 micrometers. Not all HEPA filters can effectively stop dust; while vacuum cleaners with HEPA filters, water, or cyclones may filter more effectively than without, they may still exhaust millions of particles per cubic foot of air circulated. Central vacuum cleaners can be effective in removing dust, especially if they are exhausted directly to the outdoors.

Air filters differ greatly in their effectiveness.  Laser particle counters are an effective way to measure filter effectiveness; medical grade instruments can test for particles as small as 0.3 micrometers. In order to test for dust in the air, there are several options available. Pre-weighed filter and matched weight filters made from polyvinyl chloride or mixed cellulose ester are suitable for respirable dust (less than 10 micrometers in diameter).

Dust resistant surfaces
A dust resistant surface is a state of prevention against dust contamination or damage, by a design or treatment of materials and items in manufacturing or through a repair process . A reduced tacticity of a synthetic layer or covering can protect surfaces and release small molecules that could have remained attached. A panel, container or enclosure with seams may feature types of strengthened structural rigidity or sealant to vulnerable edges and joins.

Outer space
Cosmic dust is widely present in outer space, where gas and dust clouds are the primary precursors for planetary systems. The zodiacal light, as seen in a dark night sky, is produced by sunlight reflected from particles of dust in orbit around the Sun. The tails of comets are produced by emissions of dust and ionized gas from the body of the comet. Dust also covers solid planetary bodies, and vast dust storms can occur on Mars which cover almost the entire planet. Interstellar dust is found between the stars, and high concentrations produce diffuse nebulae and reflection nebulae.

Dust is widely present in the galaxy. Ambient radiation heats dust and re-emits radiation into the microwave band, which may distort the cosmic microwave background power spectrum. Dust in this regime has a complicated emission spectrum and includes both thermal dust emission and spinning dust emission.

Dust samples returned from outer space have provided information about conditions of the early solar system. Several spacecraft have sought to gather samples of dust and other materials. Among these craft was Stardust, which flew past 81P/Wild in 2004, and returned a capsule of the comet's remains to Earth. In 2010 the Japanese Hayabusa spacecraft returned samples of dust from the surface of an asteroid.

Atmospheric gallery

Dust mites 

House dust mites are present indoors wherever humans live. Positive tests for dust mite allergies are extremely common among people with asthma. Dust mites are microscopic arachnids whose primary food is dead human skin cells, but they do not live on living people. They and their feces and other allergens that they produce are major constituents of house dust, but because they are so heavy they are not suspended for long in the air.  They are generally found on the floor and other surfaces, until disturbed (by walking, for example). It could take somewhere between twenty minutes and two hours for dust mites to settle back down out of the air.

Dust mites are a nesting species that prefer a dark, warm, and humid climate. They flourish in mattresses, bedding, upholstered furniture, and carpets. Their feces include enzymes that are released upon contact with a moist surface, which can happen when a person inhales, and these enzymes can kill cells within the human body. House dust mites did not become a problem until humans began to use textiles, such as western style blankets and clothing.

See also 

 Contamination control
 Dust bunny
 Dust explosion
 Hanānā
 Lint (material)
 Medical geology
 Mineral dust
 Nephelometer
 Occupational dust exposure
 Sawdust

References

Further reading
 Holmes, Hannah; (2001)The Secret Life of Dust. Wiley. 
 Steedman, Carolyn; (2002) Dust. Manchester University Press.

External links

Global map of atmospheric dust

 
Articles containing video clips